Guram Makayev (born 18 February 1970) is a retired Kazakhstani football forward.

Makayev played club football for FC Kairat in the Soviet First League, before playing for several clubs in the Kazakhstan Premier League, including FC Ekibastuzets and FC Atyrau. He also had a spell in Belgium with K.F.C. Lommel S.K. and Royal Antwerp FC.

Makayev made 10 appearances and scored one goal for the Kazakhstan national football team from 1994 to 1998.

References

External links

1970 births
Living people
Kazakhstani footballers
Kazakhstan international footballers
Kazakhstani expatriate footballers
Kazakhstan Premier League players
Belgian Pro League players
FC Kairat players
FC Shakhter Karagandy players
FC Taraz players
FC Atyrau players
FC Ordabasy players
FC Zhetysu players
Royal Antwerp F.C. players
K.F.C. Lommel S.K. players
Footballers at the 1998 Asian Games
Expatriate footballers in Belgium
Association football forwards
Asian Games competitors for Kazakhstan